Tove Tellback (née Ruth Lilly Margareta Swanstrøm, July 25, 1899 – January 20, 1986) was a Norwegian actress. She made her film debut in 1926 as Berit Glomgaarden in Carl Theodor Dreyer's Glomdalsbruden.

Family
Tove Tellback was born in Kristiania (now Oslo), Norway as Ruth Lilly Margareta "Toppen" Swanstrøm, the daughter of Lars Magnus Swanstrøm (1868–1939) and Aagot Bjørnson (1872–1968). She married 	Johan Mølbach-Thellefsen (1897–1973) in 1922, and she performed under the stage name Tove Tellback while using the married name Toppen Mølbach-Thellefsen (a.k.a. Mølback Tellefsen). She married a second time in 1935, to Ludvig Cæsar Martin Aubert (1878–1964).

Filmography
 1926: Glomdalsbruden as Berit Glomgaarden
 1927: Troll-elgen as Ingrid Rustebakke
 1928: Cafe X as Lilly
 1933: Vi som går kjøkkenveien as Ellen, Beck's daughter

References

External links
 
 Tove Tellback at the Swedish Film Database
 Tove Tellback at Sceneweb
 Tove Tellback at Filmfront

1899 births
1986 deaths
20th-century Norwegian actresses
Actresses from Oslo